Fox Creek may refer to:

Places in Canada
Fox Creek, Alberta, a town in Alberta
Fox Creek Airport, in Alberta
Fox Creek, New Brunswick, a community in Dieppe, New Brunswick

Places in the United States
Fox Creek, Colorado, an unincorporated community
Fox Creek (Muckalee Creek tributary), a stream in Georgia
Fox Creek (Bee Creek tributary), a stream in Missouri
Fox Creek (Bryant Creek tributary), a stream in Missouri
Fox Creek (Meramec River tributary), a stream in Missouri
Fox Creek (Mississippi River tributary), a stream in Missouri
Fox Creek (Sugar Creek tributary), a stream in Missouri
Fox Creek (Catskill Creek tributary), a tributary of Catskill Creek in New York
Fox Creek (Schoharie Creek tributary), a tributary of Schoharie Creek in New York
Fox Creek Range, in Elko County, Nevada
Fox Creek (South Dakota), a stream
Fox Creek, Wisconsin, an unincorporated community

See also
Fox Crossing (disambiguation)
Fox River (disambiguation)